City Solar AG is a producer of large-scale photovoltaic power plants, taking care of all aspects of production.  This includes site location, planning, construction, and management.  The company was started in 2002 in Bad Kreuznach, Germany, but now has offices in Saarbrücken, Berlin, Chemnitz, Augsburg, and Madrid.

City Solar has produced over a dozen power stations including the world's largest photovoltaic power plant located in Beneixama, Spain.  The Beneixama photovoltaic power plant is a 10MWp power station, with 100,000 solar modules, encompassing an area of approximately 500,000m2   As of 2007, City Solar has 4 more plants under construction or in development.

See also
Photovoltaic power stations
List of photovoltaics companies

References

Solar energy companies of Germany
Photovoltaics manufacturers